In enzymology, a phospho-N-acetylmuramoyl-pentapeptide-transferase is an enzyme that catalyzes the chemical reaction

UDP-Mur2Ac(oyl-L-Ala-gamma-D-Glu-L-Lys-D-Ala-D-Ala) + undecaprenyl phosphate  UMP + Mur2Ac(oyl-L-Ala-gamma-D-Glu-L-Lys-D-Ala-D-Ala)-diphosphoundecaprenol

Thus, the two substrates of this enzyme are UDP-Mur2Ac(oyl-L-Ala-gamma-D-Glu-L-Lys-D-Ala-D-Ala) and undecaprenyl phosphate, whereas its 2 products are UMP and Mur2Ac(oyl-L-Ala-gamma-D-Glu-L-Lys-D-Ala-D-Ala)-diphosphoundecaprenol.

This enzyme participates in peptidoglycan biosynthesis. It can be expressed efficiently by a cell-free protein expression system.

Nomenclature 
This enzyme belongs to the family of transferases, specifically those transferring non-standard substituted phosphate groups. The systematic name of this enzyme class is UDP-MurAc(oyl-L-Ala-gamma-D-Glu-L-Lys-D-Ala-D-Ala): undecaprenyl-phosphate phospho-N-acetylmuramoyl-pentapeptide-transferase. Other names in common use include MraY transferase, UDP-MurNAc-L-Ala-D-gamma-Glu-L-Lys-D-Ala-D-Ala:C55-isoprenoid, alcohol transferase, UDP-MurNAc-Ala-gammaDGlu-Lys-DAla-DAla:undecaprenylphosphate, transferase, phospho-N-acetylmuramoyl pentapeptide translocase, phospho-MurNAc-pentapeptide transferase, phospho-NAc-muramoyl-pentapeptide translocase (UMP), phosphoacetylmuramoylpentapeptide translocase, and phosphoacetylmuramoylpentapeptidetransferase.

References

Further reading 

 
 
 
 

EC 2.7.8
Enzymes of unknown structure